Tegostoma praestantalis is a moth in the family Crambidae. It was described by Daniel Lucas in 1943. It is found in Algeria.

References

Odontiini
Moths described in 1943
Moths of Africa